Franz Xaver Josef Baron von Unertl (21 February 1675 – 22 January 1750) was a Bavarian politician.

Unertl was born in Munich. He served as Electoral Bavarian Privy Council Chancellor and Conference Minister. His role under the Austrian occupation during the Spanish Succession War remains dubious. He died in his home town of Munich.

His sister Maria Johanna was married to the important salt merchant Johann Baptista Ruffini.

External links 
 Short Biography of von Unertl in the Allgemeine Deutsche Biographie

1675 births
1750 deaths
Politicians from Munich
Barons of Germany
People from the Duchy of Bavaria
Geheimrat
Political office-holders in Bavaria